Topilo Spa (/) is a small spa in southern Serbia, located 25 km north of the city of Niš, in the valley of the Toponička River.

While the mineral sources had been used by villagers from Vele Polje and Kravlje for hemp processing, spa facilities are of recent date. First weekend houses were built in the 1970s by the local residents. Gradually, the area saw housing development, and today there are 200 houses for permanent and weekend dwelling. Around 500 beds in private homes are available for visitors. Apart from the spa facilities, the valley features a picnic area around the river, frequented by numerous daily visitors during the summer.

Hot mineral water with the temperature of  springs from 18 sources, with total capacity of around 10 m3/s. A small cottage hospital with seven beds and two hot water pools is available for patients. The water is said to be beneficial for rheumatic and gastric disorders. Accommodation is also available in private apartments and rooms.

Gallery

References

External links
 Official website
 Raj na Toponičkoj reci – Banja Topilo, Portal Mladi

Spa towns in Serbia
Populated places in Nišava District